Haifa Group 
is a private international corporation which primarily manufactures Potassium Nitrate for agriculture and industry, specialty plant nutrients and food phosphates . 
Haifa Group (Haifa) is the world pioneer in developing and supplying Potassium Nitrate and Specialty Plant Nutrients for advanced agriculture in various climates, weather, and soil conditions. Haifa also manufactures Controlled Release Fertilizers (CRF) for agriculture, horticulture, ornamentals, and turf. Many of Haifa's fertilizers can be used as a fertilizer solution that is applied through drip irrigation. This latter application is the principal driver of demand today, now that more countries are turning to controlled irrigation systems that make more efficient use of water.

History 
Haifa Group was founded in Israel in 1967 (original name was Haifa Chemicals Ltd.). The company's name is a tribute to the city of Haifa, where Haifa Group was established and where the company's headquarters have been located since.

Haifa Group was founded as a government-owned company with a mission to develop the natural resources of Potash in the Dead Sea area and the Negev region. The industrial value of Potash for agriculture uses was just uncovered.

With innovative solutions as foliar feeding and side-dressing, water-soluble fertilizers (WSF), and controlled release fertilizers (CRF), Haifa Group revolutionized agriculture and influenced agriculture technologies.

Today Haifa Group's global activities embrace agriculture societies in 5 continents and in more than 100 countries. Haifa group includes 16 subsidiaries worldwide and production facilities in Israel, France, USA, and Canada. 
The annual turnover estimation is around $700 Million (2010).

Since 1989 Haifa Group is owned by Trance Resource Inc. (TRI), An American Holding Company controlled by The Trump Group.

Influence on agriculture 

Potassium, along with nitrogen and phosphorus, is one of the three essential plant macronutrients, and is taken up by crops from soils in relatively large amounts. The absence or low availability of Potassium results in death of the plant, or poor growth that is generally accompanied by visual deficiency symptoms.

Some crop-specific deficiency symptoms associated with potassium:

 Grain crops such as corn, sorghum and small grains have weak stalks accompanied by reduced gra in size and yield.
 Cotton leaves turn reddish-brown, appear scorched, become bronze then black, and eventually fall off. Bolls are generally knotty, resulting in low quality fiber and poor yield.
 Tomatoes exhibit uneven fruit ripening, poor texture and soft fruit.
 The skin of stone fruits is distorted. The fruit is small and poor in quality.
 Yield of forage crops is low, and quality is poor

Haifa is supplying about 30% of the global demand for Potassium Nitrate fertilizers. Farmers discovered the fertilizing powers of minerals hundreds of years ago, but it was the industrial manufacturing of fertilizing products that made these advantages reachable and affordable. 
Haifa is a pioneer in the chemical industry of agriculture solutions for leveraging crops – vegetables, field corps, orchards, ornamentals, turf herbs and forestry.
Using fertilizers requires changes in methodologies, routines and traditions that lead agriculture for centuries and millenniums. Haifa is influencing this conservative and traditional profession by distribution of knowledge. In fact, Haifa became a source of agriculture knowledge, data and experience for millions of agrarians and agronomists from around the world.
In 2011 Haifa transferred the knowledge to the internet, free to everyone, and launched a professional network where people from the agricultural sector around the globe can share knowledge and experience.

Product lines  
 Plant nutrition – potassium nitrate products
 Water Soluble Fertilizers - NPK blends for fertigation, soilless greenhouses, and the open field
 Controlled Release Fertilizers (CRF) - with longevity of 2 to 16 months
 Potassium Nitrate based granular NPK fertilizers
 Biostimulants
 Micronutrients
 Industrial chemicals

References

External links 
 
 Haifa Chemicals info - BDIcode 
 Company Overview - Businessweek

Chemical companies of Israel